Nangal Chaudhry Assembly constituency is one of the 90 Legislative Assembly constituencies of Haryana state in India.

It is part of Mahendragarh district.

Members of the Legislative Assembly

Election results

2019

See also
 List of constituencies of the Haryana Legislative Assembly
 Mahendragarh district

References

Mahendragarh district
Assembly constituencies of Haryana